La Voix is the French Canadian version of The Voice. Season 2 of La Voix was broadcast from 19 January 2014 to 13 April 2014 on TVA and was hosted for a second consecutive season by Charles Lafortune. Only Marc Dupré of season 1 judges returned, whereas first season winning judge Ariane Moffatt, and other judges Jean-Pierre Ferland and Marie-Mai were replaced by Louis-Jean Cormier, Éric Lapointe and Isabelle Boulay.

During season 2, mentors also assisted various teams. They were Dan Bigras for Team Éric Lapointe, Luc De Larochellière for Team Isabelle Boulay, Martin Léon for Team Louis-Jean Cormier and France D'Amour for Team Marc Dupré.

The winner was the finalist of Team Isabelle Boulay, the 18-year-old Yoan Garneau, who originates from Ferme-Neuve, Quebec

Blind Auditions

Episode 1 

Date of broadcast : 19 January 2014

Group performance : The coaches - "La Voix que j'ai"

Episode 2 

Date of broadcast : 26 January 2014

Note: Episode 2 experienced technical difficulties. During Catherine Grenier's audition, Éric Lapointe damaged his "I Want You" button. During G'Nee's audition, Marc Dupré and Éric Lapointe's chairs did not turn, despite them hitting their "I Want You" buttons.

Episode 3 

Date of broadcast : 2 February 2014

Episode 4 

Date of broadcast : 9 February 2014

Episode 5 

Date of broadcast : 16 February 2014

Duels

Episode 6
Date of broadcast : 23 February 2014
 The participant was safe
 The participant was eliminated
 The participant lost the duel, but was stolen by another coach

Episode 7
Date of broadcast : 2 March 2014
 The participant was safe
 The participant was eliminated
 The participant lost the duel, but was stolen by another coach

Episode 8
Date of broadcast : 9 March 2014
 The participant was safe
 The participant was eliminated
 The participant lost the duel, but was stolen by another coach

Battle round

Episode 9 
Date of broadcast : 16 March 2014

 The participant was safe
 The participant was eliminated

Songs outside competition

Live shows

Episode 10 
Date of broadcast : 23 March 2014

Opening song :  Sheryl Crow the participants of La Voix
"Everyday Is a Winding Road", Mathieu Lavoie, Rémi Chassé and Sabrina Paton (Team Louis-Jean Cormier)
"All I Wanna Do", with Audrey Fréchette, Mathieu Provençal and Rita Tabbakh (Team Éric Lapointe)
"Callin' Me When I'm Lonely", with Claudia Marsan, Véronique Gilbert and Marie-Ève Fournier (Équipe Isabelle Boulay)
"Soak Up the Sun", with Mélina Laplante, Lawrence Castera and G'Nee (Team Marc Dupré)

 The participant was safe
 The participant was eliminated

Episode 11 
Date broadcast : 30 March 2014

Opening song :  Pierre Lapointe with the participants of La Voix
"La forêt des mal-aimés", with Élie Dupuis, Julie Lefebvre and Renée Wilkin (Team Marc Dupré)
"Le colombarium", with Valérie Lahaie, Philippe Lauzon and Éloïse Boutin-Masse (Team Éric Lapointe)
"La sexualité", with Rémi Basque, Valérie Daure et Éléonore Lagacé (Team Louis-Jean Cormier)
"Au bar des suicidés", with Philippe Berghella, Sandra Christin et Yoan Garneau (Équipe Isabelle Boulay)
"Deux par deux rassemblés", with all the participants

 The participant was safe
 The participant was eliminated

Semi-final

Episode 12 
Date de diffusion : 6 April 2014

 The participant was safe
 The participant was eliminated

Final

Episode 13 

Date of broadcast : 13 April 2014

Opening songs:  Cee Lo Green with the finalists of La Voix (Rémi Chassé, Renée Wilkin, Valérie Lahaie, Yoan Garneau)
Crazy, from Gnarls Barkley
Fuck You! from Cee Lo Green

For the grand finale, like in season 1 of the series, the final song interpreted by the finalists were original songs by their respective coaches or mentors.

 The participant won the title of La Voix
 The participant was eliminated

References

La Voix
2014 in Canadian music
2014 Canadian television seasons